Conrad Anker (born November 27, 1962) is an American rock climber, mountaineer, and author. He was the team leader of The North Face climbing team for 26 years until 2018. In 1999, he located George Mallory's body on Everest as a member of a search team looking for the remains of the British climber. Anker suffered a widow maker heart attack in 2016 during an attempted ascent of Lunag Ri with David Lama. Anker was flown via air ambulance to Kathmandu where he underwent emergent coronary angioplasty with a stent placed in his proximal left anterior descending artery. Afterwards he retired from high altitude mountaineering, but otherwise he continues his work. He lives in Bozeman, Montana.

Ascents and expeditions
 1987 Southeast Face Gurney Peak, Kichatna Mountains, Alaska Range, Alaska, United States. First Ascent (FA) with Seth 'S.T.' Shaw, Robert Ingle and James Garrett; summit attained May 8, 1987.
 1989 Northwest Face Mount Hunter, Alaska Range, Alaska, USA. FA with Seth 'S.T.' Shaw, summit attained July 3, 1989.
 1990 Rodeo Queen, Streaked Wall, Zion National Park, Utah, USA. FA with Mugs Stump.
 1992 East Buttress, Middle Triple Peak, Kichatna Spires, Alaska, USA, 2nd ascent with Seth Shaw.
 1992 Shunes Buttress, Red Arch Mountain, Zion National Park. FFA with Dave Jones.
1994 Badlands (YDS VI 5.10 A3 WI4+, 1000m), Southeast Face, Torre Egger, Patagonia. Conrad Anker, Jay Smith and Steve Gerberding (USA), FA December 12, 1994.
 1997 The Northwest Face (V 5.8, 2100m), Peak Loretan, Ellsworth Mountains, Antarctica (solo) Jan 15–16, 1997.
 1997 Rakekniven Peak, Queen Maud Land, Antarctica, FA with Alex Lowe and Jon Krakauer. Featured in the cover article of the February 1998 National Geographic Magazine.
 1997 Tsering Mosong, Latok II, Karakorum, Pakistan, FA with Alexander Huber, Thomas Huber and Toni Gutsch.
 1997 Continental Drift, El Capitan, Yosemite, CA, USA. FA with Steve Gerberding and Kevin Thaw.
 1999 Mallory and Irvine Research Expedition, Mount Everest, Nepal / Tibet.
 1999 Shishapangma American Ski Expedition, Tibet. Survived a massive avalanche which killed climbing partner Alex Lowe and cameraman David Bridges.
 2001 East Face of Vinson Massif, Ellsworth Mountains, Antarctica. FA with Jon Krakauer. Featured on PBS series NOVA in February 2003.
2002 National Geographic expedition to make an unsupported crossing of the remote Changtang Plateau in Tibet with Galen Rowell, Rick Ridgeway and Jimmy Chin. The expedition was featured in National Geographic's April 2003 issue and documented in Rick Ridgeway's book The Big Open.
 2005 Southwest Ridge, Cholatse, Khumbu region, Nepal – summit attained with Kevin Thaw, John Griber, Kris Erickson and Abby Watkins on May 12, 2005.
 2007 Leads Altitude Everest Expedition 2007, joined by Leo Houlding, Jimmy Chin and Kevin Thaw, retracing Mallory's last steps on Everest. 2nd summit. First documented free climb of the Second Step.
 2011 Shark's Fin, Meru Peak, FA with Jimmy Chin and Renan Ozturk.
 2012 Leads "Everest Education Expedition" with National Geographic, The North Face, Montana State University and Mayo Clinic – 3rd summit, this time without oxygen. With Cory Richards, Sam Elias, Kris Erickson, Emily Harrington, Philip Henderson, Mark Jenkins, David Lageson PhD, Hilaree O'Neill. Mayo Team – Dr. Bruce Johnson, Landon Bassett, Derek Campbell, Amine Issa. Base Camp Support Andy Bardon, Travis Courthouts, Anjin Herndon, Max Lowe.
Anker has also climbed notable routes in Yosemite Valley (California), Zion National Park (Utah), Baffin Island (Canada), and the Ellsworth Mountains in Antarctica.

Writings

Films
 Shackleton's Antarctic Adventure (2001)
 Light of the Himalaya (2006). At the heart of the planet's most formidable mountain range live people who suffer from the highest rates of cataract blindness on the planet. The North Face athletes join eye surgeons from Nepal and America in hopes of making a difference. The film follows the doctors' work on the Himalayan Cataract Project all the way to the summit of a 21,000-foot Himalayan giant.
 The Endless Knot (2007). Directed by Michael Brown and produced by David D'Angelo, an HDTV documentary film with Rush HD and The North Face. In October 1999, Alex Lowe and Conrad Anker were buried by an avalanche in the Tibetan Himalaya. Anker barely survived the avalanche, but was overcome with Survivor's Guilt. In the months following the tragedy, he worked to comfort Lowe's widow, and eventually they unexpectedly found love.
 The Wildest Dream (2010), IMAX, directed by Anthony Geffen, Altitude Films, US distribution, National Geographic Entertainment releasing.
 Meru, a 2015 documentary film about climbing the Shark's fin route of Meru Central
 National Parks Adventure (2016), a short IMAX film/documentary by MacGillivray Freeman about the National Park Service.
 Lunag Ri (2016), a documentary film by Joachim Hellinger about the attempted ascent of the Lunag Ri by Conrad Anker and David Lama
Black Ice (2020), which premiered at the fifteenth Reel Rock festival, features a crew of aspiring ice climbers who travel from the Memphis Rox gym to the frozen wilds of Montana, where mentors Manoah Ainuu, Conrad Anker and Fred Campbell share their love of winter adventure in the mountains.
Torn (2021), a documentary film by Max Lowe about the death of his father, Alex Lowe, and subsequent relationship and marriage between his mother, Jennifer Lowe-Anker, and Anker.

Awards 
 2008 – Simon Scott-Harden Award for Environmental Design Excellence – Batch 44
 2010 – David A Brower Award – American Alpine Club
2015 – The George Mallory Award – Wasatch Mountain Film Festival
 2016 – Golden Pitons: Lifetime Achievement – Climbing magazine
 2017 – Honorary Doctorate Degree at the University of Utah
 2018 – Jack Roberts Lifetime Achievements Award – Cody, WY Ice Festival

See also
List of Mount Everest summiters by number of times to the summit
Timex Expedition WS4

References

External links
 Conrad Anker's  "return to the outdoors" blog
 Conrad Anker's website
 Conrad Anker on the North Face website
 Conrad Anker, Leader of the 2012 Everest Education Expedition 
 Conrad Anker on Altitude Everest Expedition 2007
 The Wildest Dream / Official Website
 The Endless Knot / Official Website
 Light of the Himalaya / Official Website
 Dave Reuss, "Gallatin to the Ganges", Outside Bozeman magazine
 BBC Radio 4: Desert Island Discs'' / Conrad Anker
 

1962 births
Living people
American mountain climbers
American rock climbers
American non-fiction outdoors writers
American male non-fiction writers
Sportspeople from Bozeman, Montana
American summiters of Mount Everest
Ice climbers